Shame is the debut studio album by the American rock band Brad. It was released on April 27, 1993, through Epic Records.

Overview
Brad formed officially in 1992, although the band members had been playing together for a long time before that. The band originally wanted to go by the name Shame, but the name was already taken by a band featuring musician Brad Wilson. Instead, the band took the name Brad and decided to name their debut album Shame.

The album was recorded in October 1992 in roughly 20 days at Avast Recording Co. in Seattle, Washington. Many tracks are taken from in-studio jam sessions. The band members produced the album themselves. The album was mixed by Brendan O'Brien. The album's cover art was provided by Seattle's Crocodile Cafe.

Shame, featuring a raw sound and an eclectic mix of styles, was released to mixed reviews and moderate sales. The track "20th Century" was a minor hit in the UK. The album charted at number 14 on Billboards Top Heatseekers chart. While sometimes categorised as “grunge”, the band sit apart in some ways: “Despite all of Brad’s connections to ’90s grunge, neither Shame nor Interiors sound much like the defining music of that scene, instead featuring soft, nocturnal rock, giddy rhythms and glossy funk jams. More importantly, Shawn Smith’s presence defines Brad even more than Gossard’s musical contributions or inherent fame. Smith is an unusual vocalist even without the nebulous grunge influences of Brad’s apparent circle of friends; adjacent to era contemporaries like Soundgarden, Alice in Chains, Gossard and Jeff Ament’s Green River or Regan and Andrew Wood’s Malfunkshun, Smith’s honeyed falsetto starts to sound like the song of another species altogether.” Spectrumculture”

Music videos were made for the songs "Buttercup" and "20th Century".

Track listing

Personnel

Brad
Stone Gossard – guitars
Regan Hagar – drums, cover and package design
Shawn Smith – vocals, piano, organ, guitar on "Down"
Jeremy Toback – bass guitar, lead vocals and organ on "Down"

Additional musicians and production
Jenny Behe – mixing assistance
Brad – production
Greg Calbi – mastering
Crocodile Cafe, Seattle, Washington – cover photo
Brett Eliason – second engineer
Sony Felito – post-pro engineering
Bashiri Johnson – percussion
Eric Johnson – disc art
Stuart Hallerman – Avast assistance
Noel Lakey – first engineer
Mark Lindsay – painting
Lance Mercer – band photos
Brendan O'Brien – mixing
Joel Zimmerman – Epic art direction

Chart positions

Album

Singles

Accolades
The information regarding accolades attributed to Shame is adapted in part from Acclaimed Music.

References

1993 debut albums
Brad (band) albums
Epic Records albums
Albums produced by Stone Gossard